Kristján Jónsson may refer to:

 Kristján Jónsson (politician) (1852–1926), Icelandic politician
 Kristján Jónsson (footballer) (born 1963), Icelandic footballer